The first USS Vision (SP-744), later USS SP-744, was a United States Navy patrol vessel in commission from 1917 to 1919.

History
Vision was built as a private, wooden-hulled, "Express-Cruiser"-type screw motor launch of the same name in 1916 by the Albany Boat Corporation at Watervliet, New York, to a design by Thomas V. Taylor. On 3 July 1917, the U.S. Navy acquired her under a free lease from her owner, L. E. Anderson, for use as a section patrol boat during World War I. She was commissioned the same day as USS Vision (SP-744). She soon was renamed USS SP-744 to avoid confusion with the patrol vessel , which was commissioned on 27 August 1917.

Assigned to the 2nd Naval District in southern New England and based at Newport, Rhode Island, SP-744 served on harbor and harbor entrance patrol duties, including patrols off the Naval War College and Rose Island, until November 1917. After undergoing engine repairs from November 1917 to February 1918, she resumed patrols in the Newport area.

On 23 June 1918, SP-744 got underway from Newport and headed southward for duty in the 8th Naval District. Proceeding via a succession of ports along the United States East Coast from New London, Connecticut, to Charleston, South Carolina, SP-744 arrived at St. Augustine, Florida, on 15 October 1918. She subsequently operated out of Miami, Florida, for the rest of World War I and into January 1919.

SP-744 was decommissioned at Miami on 22 January 1919 and returned to her owner the same day.

References

Department of the Navy Naval History and Heritage Command Online Library of Selected Images: U.S. Navy Ships: USS Vision (SP-744), 1917-1919. Later renamed SP-744
NavSource Online: Section Patrol Craft Photo Archive SP-744 ex-Vision (SP 744)

Patrol vessels of the United States Navy
World War I patrol vessels of the United States
Ships built in New York (state)
1916 ships